H1504+65 is an enigmatic peculiar star in the constellation Ursa Minor. With a surface temperature of 200,000 K (360,000°F) and an atmosphere composed of carbon, oxygen and 2% neon, it is the second hottest white dwarf ever discovered. It is thought to be the stellar core of a post-asymptotic giant branch star, though its composition is unexplainable by current models of stellar evolution.

References

White dwarfs
Ursa Minor (constellation)